Parasaccogaster melanomycter is a species of viviparous brotula endemic to Colombia.

References

Bythitidae
Endemic fauna of Colombia
Fish of Colombia
Taxonomy articles created by Polbot
Fish described in 1981